Abcde (pronounced ) is a feminine given name in the United States. As many as 328 children, all girls, were named Abcde in the United States between 1990 and 2014. As of 2017, 373 females were named Abcde. The name is derived from the first five letters of the English alphabet in order, and has no other origin or meaning.

In November 2018, a five-year-old girl named Abcde was allegedly mocked by a Southwest Airlines gate agent at John Wayne Airport in Santa Ana, California.  The ensuing news coverage compelled the airline to publicly apologize and privately reprimand the employee.

References

Feminine given names
North American given names